Henry Darcy (1803–1858) was a French engineer.

Henry Darcy may also refer to:

Henry Darcy (MP), member of parliament for Knaresborough and Huntingdonshire
Cecil D'Arcy (Henry Cecil Dudgeon D'Arcy, 1850–1881), VC recipient